The Commission for Youth Media Protection (German: Kommission für Jugendmedienschutz, KJM) is a German state organisation that is intended to regulate the exposure of children to mass media. It is responsible for promoting compliance with the State Treaty on Youth Media Protection (German: Jugendmedienschutz-Staatsvertrag).

In February 2018 it commissioned research into loot boxes in video games, but concluded in March 2018 that loot boxes did not at that time constitute a specific threat to children.

In 2021, the organisation stated that it intended to block several Internet pornography websites for failing to implement age verification for access to their content.

See also 
 Protection of Young Persons Act (Germany)
 Federal Department for Media Harmful to Young Persons

References

External links 
 

Youth in Germany
Censorship in Germany
Internet censorship
Age verification
Regulatory agencies of Germany